Pearl Apartments and Windsor Apartments are two historic apartment buildings located at Springfield, Greene County, Missouri. The Pearl Apartments were built in 1926, and the Windsor Apartments in 1937.  They are almost identical and are three-story, Commercial Block buildings of wood-frame construction with a brick exterior.  They have an unadorned brick facade consisting of three bays of paired window openings with limestone quoins and sills.

It was listed on the National Register of Historic Places in 2004.

References

Residential buildings on the National Register of Historic Places in Missouri
Residential buildings completed in 1926
Buildings and structures in Springfield, Missouri
National Register of Historic Places in Greene County, Missouri